Bill Nunn (6 May 1951 – 22 February 2022) was an Australian rules footballer who played with North Melbourne in the Victorian Football League (VFL).

Notes

External links 

Bill Nunn's playing statistics from The VFA Project

1951 births
2022 deaths
Australian rules footballers from Victoria (Australia)
North Melbourne Football Club players
Brunswick Football Club players